Joe Clarke (22 December 1882 – 22 April 1976) was an Irish republican politician.

Life 
Born in Rush, Dublin, Clarke worked for the Sinn Féin Bank, and was active in the Easter Rising. On Easter Monday morning, on 24 April 1916, Clarke was one of 13 volunteers who held the Mount Street Bridge for nine hours against the overwhelming forces of the Sherwood Foresters Regiment of the British Army. When captured, he was shot in the head, but survived, and was instead imprisoned in Liverpool Prison, Wakefield Prison and then Frongoch internment camp.

On his return to Ireland, Clarke acted as the courier for the First Dáil, but was interned from January 1921. Released in 1923, he acted as caretaker of the Sinn Féin headquarters on Harcourt Street, and founded the Irish Book Bureau. Although the Anti-Treaty Sinn Féin rejected participation in the Dáil, they continued to contest local elections, and Clarke sat on Dublin City Council.

Clarke was a founder member of Comhairle na Poblachta in 1929. In 1937, he worked with Brian O'Higgins to establish the Wolfe Tone Weekly as a light-hearted party newspaper. In August 1939, Clarke was interned at Arbour Hill, then later at Cork County Jail.

Although Clarke had served under Éamon de Valera during the Easter Rising, the two became implacable opponents. Clarke was ejected from an official commemoration of the fiftieth anniversary of the First Dáil for interrupting de Valera's speech in order to raise the complaints of the Dublin Housing Action Committee. He vowed to outlive de Valera, he succeeded in this endeavour by outliving him a year.

Clarke was elected as a Vice-President of Sinn Féin in 1966. In the split of 1970, he supported the provisional wing, remaining Vice-President. The Dublin South West Inner City cumann of Sinn Féin is named for Clarke.

References

1882 births
1976 deaths
Burials at Glasnevin Cemetery
Irish republicans interned without trial
Irish Republican Army (1919–1922) members
Irish Republican Army (1922–1969) members
People of the Irish Civil War (Anti-Treaty side)
Local councillors in Dublin (city)
Politicians from County Dublin
Shooting survivors
Sinn Féin politicians